This is a list of Canadian television related events from 1983.

Events

Debuts

Ending this year

Television shows

1950s
Country Canada (1954–2007)
The Friendly Giant (1958–1985)
Hockey Night in Canada (1952–present)
The National (1954–present)
Front Page Challenge (1957–1995)
Wayne and Shuster Show (1958–1989)

1960s
CTV National News (1961–present)
Land and Sea (1964–present)
Man Alive (1967–2000)
Mr. Dressup (1967–1996)
The Nature of Things (1960–present, scientific documentary series)
Question Period (1967–present, news program)
Reach for the Top (1961–1985)
The Tommy Hunter Show (1965–1992)
W-FIVE (1966–present, newsmagazine program)

1970s
The Beachcombers (1972–1990)
Canada AM (1972–present, news program)
Celebrity Cooks (1975–1984)
City Lights (1973–1989)
Definition (1974–1989)
the fifth estate (1975–present, newsmagazine program)
Let's Go (1976–1984)
The Littlest Hobo (1979–1985)Live It Up! (1978–1990)The Mad Dash (1978–1985)Marketplace (1972–present, newsmagazine program)Second City Television (1976–1984)Smith & Smith (1979–1985)You Can't Do That on Television (1979–1990)100 Huntley Street (1977–present, religious program)

1980sBizarre (1980–1985)The Edison Twins (1982–1986)The Frantics (1981–1984)Hangin' In (1981–1987)The Journal (1982–1992)Lorne Greene's New Wilderness (1982–1987)Seeing Things (1981–1987)Switchback (1981–1990)Today's Special (1982–1987)Thrill of a Lifetime (1981–1987)

TV movies and miniseries
 Empire, Inc. I Am a Hotel Moving Targets Out of Sight, Out of Mind Ready for Slaughter Reasonable Force Stratasphere: Portrait of Teresa Stratas Rubberface The Undaunted''

Television stations

Debuts

Network affiliation changes

See also
 1983 in Canada
 List of Canadian films of 1983

References